The Addams Family is a fictional family created by American cartoonist Charles Addams. They originally appeared in a series of 150 unrelated single-panel comics, about half of which were originally published in The New Yorker over a 50-year period from their inception in 1938. They have since been adapted to other media, such as television, film, video games, comic books, a musical, and merchandise.

The Addamses are a satirical inversion of the ideal postwar American middle-class nuclear family: an odd old money clan who delight in the macabre and are seemingly unaware or unconcerned that other people find them bizarre or frightening.  The family members were unnamed until the 1964 television series.  The Addams Family consists of Gomez and Morticia Addams, their children, Wednesday and Pugsley, and close family members, Uncle Fester and Grandmama, their butler Lurch, and Pugsley's pet octopus, Aristotle. The dimly seen Thing (later a disembodied hand) was introduced in 1954, and Gomez's Cousin Itt, Morticia's pet lion Kitty Kat and Morticia’s carnivorous plant Cleopatra in 1964. Pubert Addams, Wednesday and Pugsley's infant brother, was introduced in the 1993 film Addams Family Values.

In 1964, the live-action television series premiered on ABC and ran for two seasons. It subsequently inspired a telefilm titled Halloween with the New Addams Family and cameos from the cast in other shows. An unrelated animated series aired in 1973. The franchise was revived in the 1990s with a feature film series consisting of The Addams Family (1991) and Addams Family Values (1993). The films inspired a second animated series (1992–1993) which is set in the same fictional universe. The series was rebooted with a 1998 direct-to-video film and a spin-off live-action television series (1998–1999). In 2010, a live musical adaptation featuring Nathan Lane and Bebe Neuwirth opened on Broadway and was nominated for two Tony Awards and eight Drama Desk Awards. The series again rebooted in 2019 with the animated film The Addams Family, which led to a sequel in 2021. In 2022, Netflix debuted the original series Wednesday.

The franchise has become a staple of popular culture. It has spawned a video game series, academic books, and soundtracks which are based around its Grammy-nominated theme song. They have had a profound influence on American comics, cinema and television, and are seen as an inspiration for the goth subculture and its fashion.

History

Original The New Yorker cartoons (1938–1964)
Charles Addams began as a cartoonist in The New Yorker with a sketch of a window washer that ran on February 6, 1932. The first Addams Family cartoon was published in 1938, in a one-panel gag format. Charles Addams became a regular contributor to The New Yorker, and drew approximately 1,300 cartoons between then and his death in 1988. 58 of these would feature the Addams Family, almost all of which were published in the 1940s and 1950s.

Outside of The New Yorker, Addams also published several collections, the most notable being Dear Dead Days: A Family Album in 1959. The editor of The New Yorker, William Shawn, prevented any further Addams family cartoons from being printed after the 1964 launch of the television franchise.

Science fiction writer Ray Bradbury created a series of tales chronicling a family of Illinois monsters, the Elliotts, that bear a strong resemblance to the Addams family. These stories were anthologized in From the Dust Returned (2001), with a connecting narrative, an explanation of his work with Addams, and a 1946 illustration Addams drew for Bradbury's short story "Homecoming" in Mademoiselle magazine, the first in the Elliot family series.

TV adaptations and rise to popularity (1964–1977)

A 1964 television adaptation brought the series to a much wider audience and was well received. Producer Nat Perrin took a "less evil" approach to the characters and stories than Addams had in the cartoons, emphasizing lighter, more comedic elements. Stephen Cox later referred to the series as "more zany than spooky". The popular series, broadcast on the ABC network, ran only two seasons.

The franchise remained in the popular consciousness even after the series concluded, with the "Lurch" dance move remaining popular through the 1960s for example. The television series was often re-run through television syndication for years afterward, in some areas continuing to broadcast as late as 1991. It was followed by a 1972 crossover appearance in Scooby-Doo and a 1973 animated series. The animated incarnation featured a new cast except for Felix Silla, who returned as Cousin Itt. A one-shot special, Halloween with the New Addams Family, reunited most of the original cast from the 1964 series.

Film series and TV reboots (1991–1999)
The franchise was largely inactive throughout the 1980s. The 1987 retirement of William Shawn allowed a brief return of the cartoons to The New Yorker, though Charles Addams himself died only a year later.

Two live-action films were directed by Barry Sonnenfeld and released in the early 1990s, featuring a new cast. While the 1991 film received mixed reviews from critics, it performed reasonably well at the box office. A second film in 1993, Addams Family Values, had the inverse reception. It was highly regarded by critics but, unexpectedly, performed poorly at the box office, and earned less than half the revenue of its predecessor. This, and the sudden death of Gomez actor Raul Julia in 1994, prevented Sonnenfeld from producing further films. Both received nominations for Academy Awards, BAFTA Awards, and Hugo Awards. For her role as Morticia, Anjelica Huston was twice nominated for the Golden Globe Award for Best Actress, and Raul Julia (as Gomez), Christina Ricci (as Wednesday), Christopher Lloyd (as Fester), and Joan Cusack (as Fester's wife, Debbie Jellinsky, in the sequel) received multiple Saturn Award and American Comedy Award nominations for their portrayals. 

Following the wave of interest in the franchise, a 1992 animated television series notably saw John Astin reprise his role as Gomez, almost thirty years after his first appearance in the role in 1964. It was nominated for four Daytime Emmy Awards, including one for Astin.

A direct-to-video film, The Addams Family Reunion produced by Saban Entertainment in 1998, featured the return of Carel Struycken as Lurch, but was otherwise unrelated to the Sonnenfeld films. It was very poorly received. The film was intended as the pilot for a Canadian-produced live-action television series, The New Addams Family, made with a mostly different cast and airing the following year. Astin, then in his late 60s, returned as Grandpapa Addams in the TV series, rather than Gomez, who was played by Glenn Taranto.

Animated revival 
A Tim Burton stop-motion film was announced in 2010 but never developed. Instead, a Metro-Goldwyn-Mayer animated film was announced in 2013. Unlike the Burton version, this would use 3D computer animation. The film was eventually released in 2019, to a moderate box-office reception. A sequel, released in 2021 amid the COVID-19 pandemic, was far less successful. The first film received mixed audience reception, while the second film received negative audience reception with the two films scoring 45% and 28% on review aggregation website Rotten Tomatoes, respectively.

Premise and background

The family appears to be a branch of an extensive Addams clan with relatives all over the world. In the original television series they are said to be related to "those one-D Adamses", a fact the family are deeply ashamed of. According to the film version, the family credo is,  (pseudo-Latin: "We gladly feast on those who would subdue us"). Charles Addams was first inspired by his hometown of Westfield, New Jersey, an area full of ornate Victorian mansions and archaic graveyards. In the original comics series they live in a gothic house on Cemetery Ridge. According to the television series, the residence is a gloomy mansion adjacent to a cemetery and a swamp located in an unspecified American town. In the musical (first shown in Chicago in 2009), the house is located in Central Park. In the 2019 film, the Addamses live in an abandoned asylum located in the outskirts of the state of New Jersey which is haunted by a disembodied resident who demands the property to remain undisturbed.

Although most of the humor derives from the fact that they share macabre interests, such as putting each other and themselves in the way of bodily harm (none of which seems to have an effect), the Addamses are not evil. They are a close-knit extended family. Morticia is an exemplary mother, and she and Gomez remain passionate towards each other; as established in the television series, she calls him "bubbeleh", to which he responds by kissing her arms, behavior which Morticia can also provoke by speaking a few words in French (their meanings are not important; any words in French will do). The parents are supportive of their children (except in the 2019 film when Wednesday arrives home wearing a pink dress). The family is friendly and hospitable to visitors; in some cases, it is willing to donate large sums of money to causes (television series and films), despite the visitors' horror at the Addamses' peculiar lifestyle. The characters were unnamed until the advent of the 1964 television adaptation, except for Wednesday and Morticia who were first named for a 1962 licensed doll collection.

Adaptations

Television

The Addams Family (1964–1966)

In 1964, the ABC TV network created The Addams Family television series based on Addams's cartoon characters. The series was shot in black-and-white and aired for two seasons in 64 half-hour episodes (September 18, 1964 – September 2, 1966). During the original television run of The Addams Family television series, The New Yorker editor William Shawn refused to publish any Addams Family cartoons. However, he continued to publish other Charles Addams cartoons. Shawn regarded his magazine as targeting a more refined readership and he did not want it to be associated with characters who could be seen on television by the more general public. After Shawn's 1987 retirement, the characters were welcomed back to The New Yorker.

The New Scooby-Doo Movies (1972)
The Addams Family's first animated appearance was on the third episode of Hanna-Barbera's The New Scooby-Doo Movies, "Scooby-Doo Meets the Addams Family" (a.k.a. "Wednesday is Missing"), which first aired on CBS Saturday morning, on September 23, 1972. Four members of the original cast (John Astin, Carolyn Jones, Jackie Coogan, and Ted Cassidy) returned for the special, which involved the Addamses in a mystery with the Scooby-Doo gang. The Addams Family characters were drawn to the specifications of the original Charles Addams cartoons. After the episode aired, fans wanted more animated adventures featuring the Addamses, and Hanna-Barbera obliged.

The Addams Family Fun-House (1973)
In late 1972, ABC produced a pilot for a live-action musical variety show which was titled The Addams Family Fun-House. The cast included Jack Riley and Liz Torres as Gomez and Morticia (the pair also co-wrote the special), Stubby Kaye as Uncle Fester, Pat McCormick as Lurch and Butch Patrick (who had played Eddie Munster on The Munsters) as Pugsley. Felix Silla reprised his role as Cousin Itt, connecting it to the original TV series. The pilot aired in 1973, but it was not picked up for a series.

The Addams Family (1973)

The first animated series ran on Saturday mornings from 1973 to 1975 on NBC. In a departure from the original series, this series took the Addamses on the road in a Victorian-style RV. This series also marked the point where the relationships between the characters were changed so that Fester was now Gomez's brother, and Grandmama was now Morticia's mother (though the old relationships between the characters would be revisited in the 1977 television movie, in order to retain its continuity with the original sitcom). Although Coogan and Cassidy reprised their roles as Uncle Fester and Lurch, Astin and Jones did not; their parts were recast with Hanna-Barbera voice talents Lennie Weinrib as Gomez and Janet Waldo as Morticia, while a ten-year-old Jodie Foster provided the voice of Pugsley. Again, the characters were drawn to the specifications of the original Charles Addams cartoons. The show also had appearances from Thing, Cousin Itt, Kitty Kat and Cleopatra from the original series. The show also introduces new Addams Family's animal companions, such as Ali the alligator, Ocho the octopus and Mr. V the vulture. One season was produced, and the second season consisted of reruns. The show's theme music was completely different and it had no lyrics and no finger snaps, although it retained a bit of the four-note score from the live-action show.

The Addams Family Comic Book
From 1974 to 1975, Gold Key Comics produced a comic book series in connection with the show, but it only lasted three issues. Each issue was adapted from a TV episode, starting with "In Search of the Boola-Boola" (October 1974).

Halloween with the New Addams Family (1977)

A television reunion movie, Halloween with the New Addams Family, aired on NBC on Sunday, October 30, 1977. It features most of the original cast, except Blossom Rock, who had played Grandmama.  She was still alive but was very ill at the time; Jane Rose replaced her. Veteran character actors Parley Baer and Vito Scotti, who both had recurring roles on the original series, also appeared in the movie. The movie has a slightly different version of the theme song; the finger snaps are used but not the lyrics.

Gomez and Morticia have had two more children, Wednesday Jr. and Pugsley Jr., who strongly resemble their older siblings. Gomez's brother, Pancho, is staying with the family while Gomez attends a lodge meeting in Tombstone, Arizona. Gomez is jealous of his brother, who once courted Morticia. Halloween is nigh, and Pancho tells the children the legend of the Great Pumpkin-like character of Cousin Shy, who distributes gifts and carves pumpkins for good children on Halloween night. Wednesday (now called "Wednesday, Sr.") is home from music academy, where she is studying the piccolo (breaking glass with it). Pugsley (now "Pugsley, Sr.") is home from Nairobi medical school, where he is training to be a witch doctor. The family's home has been bugged by a gang of crooks which intends to steal the family's fortune. Lafferty, the boss, sends a gang member named Mikey into the house to investigate. Mikey panics and flees after treading on the tail of Kitty Kat the lion. The crooks employ a fake Gomez and Morticia to help them carry out their plans, along with two strong-arm goons, Hercules and Atlas. Gomez returns home to celebrate the Halloween party and trim the scarecrow. Lafferty poses as Quincy Addams (from Boston) to gain entrance to the house during the party. He has his men tie up Gomez and Morticia, and his doubles take their places, confusing Pancho, who is still in love with Morticia, and Ophelia, who is still in love with Gomez. Gomez and Morticia escape (thanks to the "Old Piccolo Game"), and rejoin the party, only to have Lafferty use various methods to try to get rid of them. Lurch scares off the thugs and terrifies Lafferty's other assistant. Fester, trying to be nice, puts Lafferty on the rack. Lafferty tries to escape through the secret passage and steps on Kitty Kat's tail. When the police arrive, the crooks gladly surrender. The Addamses are then free to celebrate Halloween happily, ending the night by singing together in welcome for Cousin Shy.

The Addams Family: The Animated Series (1992–1993)

The remake series ran on Saturday mornings from 1992 to 1993 on ABC after producers realized the success of the 1991 Addams Family movie. This series returned to the familiar format of the original series, with the Addams Family facing their sitcom situations at home. John Astin returned to the role of Gomez, and celebrities Rip Taylor and Carol Channing took over the roles of Fester and Grandmama, respectively. Veteran voice actors Jim Cummings, Debi Derryberry, Jeannie Elias and Pat Fraley did the voices of Lurch, Wednesday, Pugsley and Cousin Itt, respectively. New artistic models of the characters were used for this series, though still having a passing resemblance to the original cartoons. Two seasons were produced, with the third year containing reruns. Oddly in this series, Wednesday maintained her macabre, brooding attitude from the Addams Family movies. Still, her facial expressions and body language conveyed the happy-go-lucky, fun attitude of her portrayal in the original television show. The original Vic Mizzy theme song, although slightly different, was used for the opening.

The New Addams Family (1998–1999)

The New Addams Family was filmed in Vancouver, British Columbia, Canada, and ran for 65 episodes (one more than the original TV series) during the 1998–1999 season on the then-newly launched Fox Family Channel. Many storylines from the original series were reworked for this new series, incorporating more modern elements and jokes. John Astin returned to the franchise in some episodes of this series, albeit as "Grandpapa" Addams (Gomez's grandfather, a character introduced in Addams Family Reunion). The cast included Glenn Taranto as Gomez Addams, Ellie Harvie as Morticia, Michael Roberds as Fester, Brody Smith as Pugsley, Nicole Fugere (the only cast member from Addams Family Reunion to return) as Wednesday, John DeSantis as Lurch, Betty Phillips as Grandmama and Steven Fox as Thing.

Wednesday (2022) 

In 2021, Netflix announced a live-action TV series adaptation based on Wednesday Addams, produced by MGM Television and starring Jenna Ortega as the title character. Alfred Gough and Miles Millar were the showrunners and Tim Burton directed several episodes in his first televised directorial effort. Wednesday, a student at Nevermore Academy, solves mysteries using her psychic ability. These include murders and a 25-year-old mystery involving her family. Luis Guzmán stars as Gomez, and Catherine Zeta-Jones stars as Morticia. In addition, Fred Armisen appears as Uncle Fester, George Burcea as Lurch, Victor Dorobantu as Thing, and Isaac Ordonez as Pugsley. Hunter Doohan, Georgie Farmer, Moosa Mostafa, Emma Myers, Naomi J. Ogawa, Joy Sunday, Percy Hynes White, Thora Birch, Riki Lindhome, Jamie McShane and Gwendoline Christie were also added to the cast as series regulars. In March 2022, Christina Ricci, who portrayed Wednesday in The Addams Family (1991) and Addams Family Values (1993), joined the cast as a series regular.

Feature films

The Addams Family (1991)

In the 1990s, Orion Pictures (which by then had inherited the rights to the series) developed a film version, The Addams Family (released on November 22, 1991). Because of the studio's financial troubles at the time, Orion sold the US rights to the film to Paramount Pictures. On October 1, 2019, Paramount Pictures released double feature of Addams Family and Addams Family Values on Blu-ray in the United States.

Addams Family Values (1993)

Upon the last film's success, a sequel followed: Addams Family Values (released on November 19, 1993, with worldwide distribution by Paramount). Loosened content restrictions allowed the films to use far more grotesque humor that strove to keep the Addams cartoons' original spirit (in fact, several gags were lifted straight from the single-panel cartoons). The two films used the same cast, except for Grandmama, played by Judith Malina and Carol Kane in the first and second films, respectively. A script for a third film was prepared in 1994, but was abandoned after the sudden death of actor Raul Julia that year.

Addams Family Reunion (1998)

Another film, Addams Family Reunion, was released direct-to-video on September 22, 1998, this time by Warner Bros. through its video division. It has no relation to the Paramount movies, being in fact a full-length pilot for a second live-action television version, The New Addams Family, produced and shot in Canada. The third movie's Gomez, played by Tim Curry, follows the style of Raul Julia, while the new sitcom's Gomez, played by Glenn Taranto, is played in the style of John Astin, who had played the character in the 1960s. The only actors in this Warner Bros./Saban Entertainment production to have played in the previous Paramount films were Carel Struycken as Lurch and Christopher Hart as Thing.

Cancelled film
In 2010, it was announced that Illumination Entertainment, in partnership with Universal Pictures, had acquired the underlying rights to the Addams Family drawings. The film was planned to be a stop-motion animated film based on Charles Addams's original drawings. Tim Burton was set to co-write and co-produce the film, with a possibility to direct. In July 2013 however, it was reported that the film was cancelled.

The Addams Family (2019) and The Addams Family 2 (2021)

On October 31, 2013, it was announced in Variety that Metro-Goldwyn-Mayer will be reviving The Addams Family as an animated film with Pamela Pettler to write the screenplay and Andrew Mittman and Kevin Miserocchi to executive produce the film and they were in final negotiations with BermanBraun's Gail Berman and Lloyd Braun to produce it. By October 2017, Conrad Vernon had been hired to direct the film, which he will also produce along with Berman and Alex Schwartz, based on a screenplay written by Pettler, with revisions by Matt Lieberman. The film was released on October 11, 2019. On October 8, 2020, MGM announced that a sequel is in the works with an announcement trailer. The original cast set to return. Bill Hader and Javon "Wanna" Walton have also been cast to voice. Bill Hader played a new character named Dr. Cyrus Strange, while Javon replaced Finn Wolfhard as the voice of Pugsley Addams. Directors Greg Tiernan and Conrad Vernon returned as directors. The film was released on October 1, 2021.

Homages and adaptations
 An animated television homage was produced by Hanna-Barbera Productions. Mr. & Mrs. J. Evil Scientist, a family of fictional characters inspired by The Addams Family appeared on the Snagglepuss and Snooper and Blabber animated television series beginning in 1959 and it also starred in its own comic book.
 Comedian Melissa Hunter wrote the web series Adult Wednesday Addams, which is a comedic adaptation of the franchise. Hunter was forced to remove the series due to legal action.
 In an episode of Horrible Histories a song titled "The Borgia Family" was created in reference to the Addams Family Theme.
 In 1964, the year The Addams Family debuted, Hanna-Barbera introduced Weirdly and Creepella Gruesome and family, based in part on Mr. & Mrs. J. Evil Scientist and in part on the Addamses, as recurrent characters on The Flintstones.

Video games

Ten video games released from 1989 to 2021 were based on The Addams Family.
 Fester's Quest (1989) is a top-down adventure game that features Uncle Fester.
 The Addams Family LCD Video Game by Tiger Electronics is a handheld unit released in 1991.
 ICOM Simulations published The Addams Family video game for the TurboGrafx-CD in 1991.
 In 1992, two versions of The Addams Family were released by Ocean Software based on the 1991 movie: an 8-bit version for the Nintendo Entertainment System, Game Boy, Sega Master System, Sega Game Gear, ZX Spectrum and Commodore 64, and a 16-bit version released for the Super Nintendo Entertainment System, Amiga, Atari ST and Sega Mega Drive/Genesis.
 The games' sequel, The Addams Family: Pugsley's Scavenger Hunt (1993), also by Ocean Software, was based on the ABC animated series and was released for SNES, NES, and Game Boy (although the latter two are 8-bit remakes of the first SNES game, swapping Pugsley's and Gomez's roles).
 Addams Family Values (1994) by Ocean is based on the movie sequel and returns to the style of gameplay seen in Fester's Quest.
 An arcade shocker, The New Addams Family Electric Shock Machine (also known as Electrifying), was released by Eurocom and Nova Productions in 1999.
 A Game Boy Color game was released in 2001 for promotion of The New Addams Family. The game was titled The New Addams Family Series. In this game, the Addams mansion had been bought by a fictional company called "Funnyday" that wanted to tear down the house and surrounding grounds to make room for an amusement park.
 A 2019 mobile game for Android and iOS, The Addams Family Mystery Mansion, was released by Animoca.
 The Addams Family: Mansion Mayhem, a movie tie-in game for Steam, Nintendo Switch, PlayStation 4, Xbox and Google Stadia developed by PHL Collective and published by British publisher Outright Games, was released on September 24, 2021.

Pinball

A pinball game by Midway (under the Bally label) was released in 1992 shortly after the movie. It is the best-selling pinball game of all time.

Books

The Addams Family
This first novelisation of the television series, written by Jack Sharkey, was released near the end of the show's second season. The book details the family's arrival in their new home and explains how it got its bizarre décor. The arrival and origins of Thing are explained. Each chapter reads as a self-contained story, like episodes of the television show. The novel concludes with the Addams family discovering that their lives will be the basis for a new television series. It was published in paperback by Pyramid Books in 1965.

The Addams Family Strikes Back
The Addams Family Strikes Back by W.F. Miksch tells how Gomez plans to rehabilitate the image of Benedict Arnold by running for the local school board. The tone and characterizations in this book resemble the TV characters much more closely than in the first novel. Cousin Itt appears as a minor character in this story, but as a tiny, three-legged creature rather than the hairy, derby-hatted character seen on television and in the movies. The novel was published in paperback form by Pyramid Books in 1965.

The Addams Family: An Evilution

The Addams Family: An Evilution is a book about the "evilution" of The Addams Family characters, with more than 200 published and previously unpublished cartoons, and includes text by Charles Addams and H. Kevin Miserocchi, Director of the Tee and Charles Addams Foundation. Pomegranate Press published the book in 2010.

Advertising
In 1994, the actors cast as the Addamses in the first two films (sans the recently deceased Raul Julia) were in several Japanese television spots for the Honda Odyssey. The Addamses are seen speaking Japanese—most prominently Gomez (for whom a voice actor was used to impersonate Julia while footage from Addams Family Values was seen) and Morticia.

In 2007 and 2008, the Addams Family appeared as M&M's in an advertising campaign for M&M's Dark Chocolate.

Soundtrack
A theme song for the 1964 TV series as well as a soundtrack album the next year were released, both composed by Vic Mizzy and the latter containing all of his compositions for the series entitled Original Music From The Addams Family.

Musical

The Addams Family

In May 2007, it was announced that a musical inspired by The Addams Family drawings by Charles Addams was being developed for the Broadway stage. Broadway veterans Marshall Brickman and Rick Elice wrote the book, and Andrew Lippa wrote the score. Julian Crouch and Phelim McDermott (Improbable theatre founders) directed and designed the production, with choreography by Sergio Trujillo. A workshop and private industry presentation was held August 4–8, 2008. Featured in the cast were Bebe Neuwirth as Morticia, Krysta Rodriguez as Wednesday, and Nathan Lane as Gomez. In addition, Kevin Chamberlin played Uncle Fester and Zachary James played Lurch.

The musical opened in previews at the Lunt-Fontanne Theatre on Broadway on March 8, 2010, with an official opening on April 8, after an out-of-town tryout in Chicago at the Ford Center for the Performing Arts from November 13, 2009, to January 10, 2010. The cast includes Lane as Gomez, Neuwirth as Morticia, Terrence Mann as Mal Beineke, Carolee Carmello as Alice Beineke, Chamberlin as Uncle Fester, Jackie Hoffman as Grandma, Zachary James as Lurch, Krysta Rodriguez as Wednesday, and Wesley Taylor as Wednesday's love interest, Lucas Beineke. The Broadway production ran for 22 months, closing on December 31, 2011, after 35 previews and 722 performances.

On September 5, 2016, it was announced that the musical would premiere in the UK, on a major UK and Ireland tour produced by James Yeoburn and Stuart Matthew Price for United Theatrical. The production was directed by Matthew White and it opened at Edinburgh Festival Theatre on April 20, 2017, starring Samantha Womack, Les Dennis and Carrie Hope Fletcher.

Cast and characters

Legacy
The family has had a profound influence on American comics, cinema and television, and it has also been seen as an inspiration for the goth subculture and its fashion. According to The Telegraph, the Addamses "are one of the most iconic families in American history, up there with the Kennedys". Similarly, Time has compared "the relevance and the cultural reach" of the family with those of the Kennedys and the Roosevelts, "so much a part of the American landscape that it's difficult to discuss the country's history without mentioning them". For TV Guide, which listed the characters in the top ten of The 60 Greatest TV Families of All Time, the Addamses "provid[ed] the design for cartoonish clans to come, like the Flintstones and the Simpsons". Owing to their popularity, the first feature-length adaptation has been identified as a "cult film", while Addams Family Values was listed as one of The 50 Best family films by The Guardian and nominated for the American Film Institute's 100 Years...100 Laughs at the turn of the century. Ricci's portrayal of Wednesday in the film series was ranked one of The 100 Greatest Movie Characters by Empire, and in 2011 AOL named Morticia one of The 100 Most Memorable Female TV Characters.

See also 
The Munsters – A franchise based on a sitcom with a similar premise.

Notes

References

External links
 Tee & Charles Addams Foundation
 The Addams Family (1937) at Don Markstein's Toonopedia. Archived from the original on March 13, 2012.
 The Addams Family UK (musical website)
 The Addams Family on TVLand.com
 
 

1938 comics debuts
1988 comics endings
 
American comic strips
Black comedy comics
Fictional families
Gag cartoon comics
Gag-a-day comics
Comics about married people
Comics adapted into television series
Comics adapted into animated series
Comics adapted into plays
American comics adapted into films
Comics adapted into video games
Comics characters introduced in 1938
Mass media franchises introduced in 1938
Works originally published in The New Yorker

no:Familien Addams